Wesley College is a secondary school in Paerata, at the northern edge of Pukekohe, Auckland Region, New Zealand. The school provides education from year 9 to 13.

The school was founded by members of the Methodist Church in 1844, making it one of the country's oldest schools. Initially located in Grafton and then the Three Kings area of Auckland, it closed in 1868 before reopening in 1876 in Three Kings again. From the beginning there was an emphasis on educating Maori boys, and also played a prominent role in educating students from countries of the South Pacific. In 1924 the school was moved to its current location of Paerata, near Pukekohe. In 1985 it was one of the first boys schools in New Zealand to admit girls at the senior level.

Prince Albert College

Wesley College was located in Upper Queen Street when it closed in 1868; the building and land was donated to the Methodist Church for education purposes. In 1895, a new school with Methodist links started in that building, known as Prince Albert College. The school closed on 31 December 1906 due to financial pressures. The building was later used by Auckland Girls' Grammar School.

Principals
The following have been principals of the school:

 Revs. Alexander Reid, Thomas Buddle, George Stannard, HH Lawry, Wallis
 Rev. J H Simmonds 1895–1923
 R. C. Clark, MA (Melb), Dip Ed 1924–1944
 Rev. E. M. Marshall, BA, Dip Ed 1944–1964
 C. A. Neate, MA, Dip Tchg 1965–1967
 E. Te R. Tauroa, B AgricSc, Dip Ed, Dip Tchg 1968–1973 Believed to be the first Māori principal of a secondary school, later Race Relations Conciliator.
 J. B. McDougall, E.D., B Agric Sc, Dip Tchg 1974–1988
 G. V. Cowley, MSc (Hons), Dip Tchg, JP 1989–2002
 I. F. Faulkner, JP, MA (Hons), Dip Tchg 2003–present

Notable alumni

The arts
 Temuera Morrison – Actor (Head Prefect, 1977)
 Ian Mune – Actor and Film Director
 Richard Taylor – Multiple Academy Award Winner (Lord of the Rings Trilogy)
 Arnold Manaaki Wilson – Artist and Sculptor, Father of Contemporary Maori Art, First Maori to gain a Diploma in Fine Arts

Public service
 Koro Dewes – Ngāti Porou kaumatua and Māori language advocate
 Sialeʻataongo Tuʻivakanō – Prime Minister of Tonga (Voted in 2011 – Known as Siale Kaho while at College)
 Jim Peters – Politician
 Sir Peter Kenilorea – First Prime Minister and Current Speaker of Solomon Islands
 Roger McClay – Politician and Children's Commissioner
 Todd McClay – Member of Parliament for Rotorua, former Cook Islands diplomat (Ambassador to European Union)
 Rt Hon. Baron Fielakepa - Chief of the Defense Staff, His Majesty’s Armed Forces, Kingdom of Tonga
 Rob Storey – Politician
 Malietoa Tanumafili II – Former Head of State of Samoa
 George Tupou II – King of Tonga
 Baron Vaea – former Prime Minister of Tonga (Vaea attended between 1938 and 1941)

Science
 Walter Buller – lawyer, naturalist and ornithologist

Sport
Rugby Union
 Uini Atonio - Counties Manukau, La Rochelle, France
 Stephen Donald – New Zealand Secondary Schools, New Zealand u19s, New Zealand u21s, Counties, Waikato, Chiefs, Bath, New Zealand All Black
 Rhys Duggan – New Zealand Secondary Schools, New Zealand u19s, New Zealand u21s Waikato, Chiefs, New Zealand All Black
 Epalahame Faiva - Wakato, New Zealand u20s
 Malakai Fekitoa – Auckland, Highlanders, New Zealand All Black
 Frank Halai – Waikato, NZ Sevens, Counties Manukau, Blues, New Zealand All Black
 Sekope Kepu – New Zealand U17's, New Zealand Secondary Schools, New Zealand u19s, New Zealand u21s, Counties, NSW Waratahs, Australia – Wallabies
 Casey Laulala – New Zealand u19s, New Zealand u21s, Counties, Canterbury, Crusaders, Cardiff Blues, New Zealand All Black
 Nepo Laulala – Canterbury, Crusaders, New Zealand All Blacks
 Jonah Lomu – New Zealand U16's, New Zealand U17's, New Zealand Secondary Schools, New Zealand u19s, New Zealand u21s, Counties, Wellington, North Harbour, Blues, Chiefs, Hurricanes, Cardiff Blues, NZ Sevens, New Zealand All Black
 Tevita Mailau – New Zealand Secondary Schools, New Zealand u19s, New Zealand u21s, Northland, Auckland, Blues, Tonga Ikale Tahi
 Seilala Mapusua – New Zealand Secondary Schools, New Zealand u19s, New Zealand u21s, Otago, Highlanders, London Irish,  Kubota Spears, Manu Samoa
 Sione Molia - All Blacks Sevens
 Charles Piutau – New Zealand Secondary Schools, New Zealand u20s, Auckland, NZ Sevens, Blues, New Zealand All Black
 Siale Piutau – Counties, Highlanders, Tonga Ikale Tahi
 Augustine Pulu – Counties, Chiefs, New Zealand All Black, NZ Sevens
 David Raikuna – Counties, North Harbour, Blues, NZ Sevens
 Doug Rollerson – Manawatu, New Zealand All Black
 Sitiveni Sivivatu – Counties, Waikato, Chiefs,  ASM Clermont Auvergne, Pacific Islanders, New Zealand All Black
 George Stowers – New Zealand Secondary Schools, NZ u21s, Counties, Chiefs, Ospreys, Pacific Islanders, Manu Samoa
 Niva Ta'auso – Counties, Connacht, New Zealand Divisional XV, Junior All Blacks
 Michael Tagicakibau – Taranaki, London Welsh, Saracens, Fiji
 Sailosi Tagicakibau – Chiefs, London Irish, Pacific Islanders, Manu Samoa
 Jonathan Taumateine - Counties Manukau, Manu Samoa u20s, New Zealand u20s, Chiefs
 Ezra Taylor – Otago, Highlanders, Reds, Connacht, Manu Samoa
 Hale T-Pole – New Zealand Secondary Schools, New Zealand u19s, New Zealand u21s, Southland, Highlanders, Pacific Islanders, Tonga Ikale Tahi
 Viliame Veikoso – Otago, Fiji
Tupou Vaa'i - Chiefs & New Zealand All Blacks 
Rugby League
 Glen Fisiiahi – New Zealand Warriors player
 Fetuli Talanoa – Tonga Rugby League International/South Sydney Rabbitohs
 Tame Tupou – Kiwis/Brisbane Broncos/Bradford Bulls
 Tom Ale - NZ Warriors
 Adam Pompey - NZ Warriors
 Lunalangi Veainu - Kiwi Ferns, Black Ferns, Counties Manukau Heat

Further reading

See also
 Lists of schools in New Zealand

References

External links
 Wesley College website
 Old Friends NZ — Wesley College Schools, Auckland

Educational institutions established in 1844
Boarding schools in New Zealand
Methodist schools in New Zealand
Secondary schools in Auckland
Christianity in Auckland